The Women in Governance Awards are an annual set of awards which recognise commitment to diversity by both organisations and individuals in New Zealand. The awards are administered by Governance New Zealand and have been awarded every year since 2016. In 2022 the awards were presented on 4 August at an event at Parliament in Wellington, by Minister for Women, Hon Jan Tinetti. In 2021 the awards were presented on 10 June at an event at the Hilton Auckland, by Ministers Hon Jan Tinetti, Hon Willie Jackson and Hon Aupito William Sio.

Recipients

See also

 List of awards honoring women

References

Awards honoring women
New Zealand awards
Awards established in 2016